The Women's elimination competition at the 2021 UCI Track Cycling World Championships was held on 21 October 2021.

Results
The race was started at 21:00.

References

Women's elimination